The 1902 Buchtel football team represented Buchtel College in the 1902 college football season. The team was led by first-year head coach Forest Firestone, in his only season. Buchtel was outscored by their opponents by a total of 34–163.

Schedule

References

Buchtel
Akron Zips football seasons
Buchtel football